Cao Que (曹確), courtesy name Gangzhong (剛中), was an official of the Chinese Tang Dynasty, serving as a chancellor during the reign of Emperor Yizong.

Background 
It is not known when Cao Que was born.  His family was from the Tang Dynasty eastern capital Luoyang.  His traceable ancestry went back only to his grandfather Cao Zhou, and neither Cao Zhou nor his father Cao Jingbo was listed with any offices, although Cao Jingbo was said to have passed the imperial examinations in the Jinshi class in 803, during the reign of Emperor Dezong.  Cao Que had at least one younger brother, Cao Fen, who would also eventually serve in the imperial government.

Early career 
Cao Que himself passed the imperial examinations in the Jinshi class in 837, during the reign of Emperor Dezong's great-great-grandson Emperor Wenzong, and subsequently served on the staffs of several regional governors.  He was later recalled to the capital Chang'an to serve as an imperial censor with the title Shi Yushi, and later, he was given the office of Gongbu Yuanwailang, a low-level official at the minister of public works (工部, Gongbu), and put in charge of drafting edicts.  He was promoted to the supervisory position of Gongbu Langzhong, and also made an imperial scholar (翰林學士, Hanlin Xueshi).  He was later made Zhongshu Sheren, a mid-level official at the legislative bureau of government (中書省, Zhongshu Sheng).  He went on to serve as the acting mayor of Henan Municipality (河南, i.e., the Luoyang region), before being recalled serving as the deputy minister of defense (兵部侍郎, Bingbu Shilang).

Chancellorship 
In 863, by which time Cao Que was, in addition to being deputy minister of defense, the director of finances, then-reigning Emperor Yizong (Emperor Wenzong's cousin) gave him the designation Tong Zhongshu Menxia Pingzhangshi, making him a chancellor de facto.  It was said that Cao was well-learned in Confucian regulations, was cautious, and followed the laws.  In 867, when Emperor Yizong made his favorite musician Li Keji a general of the imperial guards, Cao pointed out that such a title was inappropriate for a musician, but Emperor Yizong did not listen to him.

After chancellorship 
Cao Que served as chancellor until 870, when he was sent out of Chang'an to serve as the military governor (Jiedushi) of Zhenhai Circuit (鎮海, headquartered in modern Zhenjiang, Jiangsu), continuing to carry the Tong Zhongshu Menxia Pingzhangshi title as an honorary title.  He later served as the military governor of Hezhong Circuit (河中, headquartered in modern Yuncheng, Shanxi) and died while at Hezhong, but it is not known when that occurred.

Son 
 Cao Xifu, courtesy name Songchen

Notes and references 

 Old Book of Tang, vol. 177.
 New Book of Tang, vol. 181.
 Zizhi Tongjian, vols. 250, 252.

Chancellors under Emperor Yizong of Tang
Tang dynasty historians
Tang dynasty jiedushi of Zhenhai Circuit
Tang dynasty jiedushi of Hezhong Circuit
Year of death unknown
Politicians from Luoyang
Historians from Henan
Year of birth unknown
Tang dynasty generals from Henan
Tang dynasty politicians from Henan
Writers from Luoyang